Jacquelyn Days Serwer is an American art historian and curator. A specialist in American art and African American art, she is the Chief Curator of the Smithsonian Institution's National Museum of African American History and Culture.

Life and career
Jacquelyn Days was born in Florida but grew up in New Rochelle, New York. She attained her undergraduate degree from Sarah Lawrence College. After earning a master's degree from the University of Chicago, she attained a doctorate from the City University of New York.

In 1985 Serwer became a curator at the Smithsonian's National Museum of American Art. In 1987 she curated an exhibition on the artist Gene Davis, entitled Gene Davis: A Memorial Exhibition.

In 1999 she became the Chief Curator of the Corcoran Gallery of Art. In 2002 she curated the first international retrospective on Pop artist Larry Rivers entitled Larry Rivers: Art and the Artist.  Serwer served as the Chief Curator for the Corcoran Gallery of Art for six years.

Serwer has been a key figure in acquiring a collection for the National Museum of African American History and Culture, including an original, used campaign office from the 2008 campaign to elect Barack Obama as President of the United States and photographs of Coretta Scott King.

Personal life
She is married to Daniel Serwer. She has two sons, one of whom is journalist Adam Serwer.

Reference list

External links

American art historians
Writers from New Rochelle, New York
American women curators
American art curators
Living people
Women art historians
Sarah Lawrence College alumni
University of Chicago alumni
City University of New York alumni
Historians from New York (state)
American women historians
Year of birth missing (living people)
African-American women academics
American women academics
African-American academics
African-American writers
21st-century African-American people
21st-century African-American women
African-American women writers